William T. Brooks Jr. (born April 6, 1964) is a former American football wide receiver who was drafted by the Indianapolis Colts in the fourth round of the 1986 NFL Draft.  A 6'1", . wide receiver from Boston University, Brooks played in 11 National Football League (NFL) seasons from 1986 to 1996 for the Colts, the Buffalo Bills, and the Washington Redskins.

Brooks was the Colts' leading receiver for five of his seven seasons with them, and recorded a career best 1,131 yards in 1986.  With the Bills, he assisted them to a championship appearance in Super Bowl XXVIII in the 1993 season.  Taking over for retired starter James Lofton, he caught 60 passes for 712 yards and five touchdowns during the season.  He also caught six passes for 92 yards and two touchdowns in the Bills 29–23 win over the Los Angeles Raiders in the divisional playoff round.  In his final season with the Bills, he caught a career-high 11 touchdown passes.

Brooks finished his career with 583 receptions for 8,001 yards and 46 touchdowns.  He also gained 106 yards on 18 carries.

Brooks has been honored by being the first Indianapolis Colts player to be inducted into the Indianapolis Colts Ring of Honor on August 22, 1998. He served as Executive Director of Administration for the Colts front office from 2002 to 2009.

Early life
Brooks attended Framingham North High School in Framingham, Massachusetts, where he broke and set several athletic records.

References

External links
 
 

1964 births
Living people
Sportspeople from Boston
Sportspeople from Framingham, Massachusetts
Players of American football from Boston
American football wide receivers
Framingham High School alumni
Boston University Terriers football players
Indianapolis Colts players
Buffalo Bills players
Washington Redskins players
Indianapolis Colts executives